Sidney Gillman (October 26, 1911 – January 3, 2003) was an American football player, coach and executive.  Gillman's insistence on stretching the football field by throwing deep downfield passes, instead of short passes to running backs or wide receivers at the sides of the line of scrimmage, was instrumental in making football into the modern game that it is today.

Gillman played football as an end at Ohio State University from 1931 to 1933.  He played professionally for one season in 1936 with the Cleveland Rams of the second American Football League.  After serving as an assistant coach at Ohio State from 1938 to 1940, Gillman was the head football coach at Miami University from 1944 to 1947 and at the University of Cincinnati from 1949 to 1954, compiling a career college football record of 81–19–2.  He then moved to the ranks of professional football, where he headed the NFL's Los Angeles Rams (1955–1959), the American Football League's Los Angeles and San Diego Chargers (1960–1969), and the NFL's Houston Oilers (1973–1974), amassing a career record of 123–104–7 in the National Football League and the American Football League.  Gillman's 1963 San Diego Chargers won the AFL Championship.  Gillman was inducted as a coach into the Pro Football Hall of Fame in 1983 and the College Football Hall of Fame in 1989.

Early life, family and education
Sidney Gillman was born in Minneapolis, Minnesota, to a Jewish family.

He played college football at Ohio State University under coach Sam Willaman, forming the basis of his offense. He was a team captain and All-Big Ten Conference end in 1933. While attending Ohio State, Gillman was a brother of the Nu chapter of the Zeta Beta Tau fraternity.

Career
Always deeply interested in the game, while working as a movie theater usher, he removed football segments from newsreels the theater would show, so that he could take them home and study them on a projector he had bought.  This dedication to filmed football plays made Gillman the first coach to study game footage, something that all coaches do today.

Gillman debated between pursuing a pro football career and entering coaching upon leaving college, with the Boston Redskins offering him a contract while Willaman wished to hire him as end coach at Western Reserve University. His participation in the inaugural Chicago College All-Star Game caused him to arrive late for Redskins training camp, and he would fail to make the team. He played one year in the American Football League (1936) for the Cleveland Rams. He became an assistant coach at Denison University, Ohio State University, and was an assistant coach to Earl Blaik of Army, then head coach at Miami University and the University of Cincinnati. He spent 21 years as a college coach or head coach, and his total record for these years was 79–18–2.

He returned to professional football as a head coach with the Los Angeles Rams, leading the team to the NFL's championship game, and then moved to the American Football League (AFL, 1960–1969), where he coached the Los Angeles and San Diego Chargers to five Western Division titles and one league championship in the first six years of the AFL's existence.

His greatest coaching success came after he was persuaded by Barron Hilton, then the Chargers' majority owner, to become the head coach of the AFL franchise he planned to operate in Los Angeles.  When the team's general manager, Frank Leahy, became ill during the Chargers' founding season, Gillman took on additional responsibilities as general manager.

As the first coach of the Chargers, Gillman gave the team a mercurial personality that matched his own.

He had much to do with the AFL being able to establish itself.  Gillman was a thorough professional, and in order to compete with him, his peers had to learn pro ways.  They learned, and the AFL became the genesis of modern professional football.

"Sid Gillman brought class to the AFL," Oakland Raiders managing general partner Al Davis once said of the man he served under on that first Chargers team. "Being part of Sid's organization was like going to a laboratory for the highly developed science of professional football."

Through Gillman's tenure as head coach, the Chargers went 87–57–6 and won five AFL Western Division titles.  In 1963 they captured the only league championship the franchise ever won by outscoring the Boston Patriots, 51–10, in the American Football League championship game in Balboa Stadium.  That game was a measure of Gillman's genius.

He crafted a game plan, "Feast or Famine", that used motion, then seldom seen, to negate the Patriots' blitzes.  His plan freed running back Keith Lincoln to rush for 206 yards.  In addition to Lincoln, on Gillman's teams through the '60s were these notable players: wide receiver Lance Alworth; offensive tackle Ron Mix; running back Paul Lowe; quarterback John Hadl; and defensive linemen Ernie Ladd and Earl Faison (Alworth and Mix are Hall of Famers).  Gillman was one of only two head coaches to hold that position for the entire 10-year existence of the American Football League (the other being fellow Hall of Fame coach Hank Stram, who coached the Dallas Texans and Kansas City Chiefs from 1960 through 1974).

Gillman approached then-NFL Commissioner Pete Rozelle in 1963 with the idea of having the champions of the AFL and the NFL play a single final game, but his idea was not implemented until the Super Bowl (originally titled the AFL-NFL World Championship Game) was played in 1967.

Following his tenure with San Diego, he coached the Houston Oilers for two years from 1973 to 1974, helping bring the club out of the funk it had been in for many seasons prior, and closer to playoff contention.  He later served as the offensive coordinator for the Chicago Bears in 1977 and as a consultant for Dick Vermeil's Philadelphia Eagles in 1980.

In July 1983, at age 71, Gillman came out of retirement after an offer from Bill Tatham, Sr. and Bill Tatham, Jr., owners of the United States Football League (USFL) expansion team the Oklahoma Outlaws.  Gillman agreed to serve as Director of Operations and signed quarterback Doug Williams, who later led the Washington Redskins to victory in Super Bowl XXII. Although Gillman signed a roster of players to play for the Tulsa, Oklahoma-based franchise, he was fired by Tatham six months later in a dispute over finances.

Gillman then served as a consultant for the USFL's Los Angeles Express in 1984.

Influence
Gillman's influence on the modern game can be seen by listing the current and former coaches and executives who either played with him or coached for him:
George Blackburn, former coach for Miami (OH), Cincinnati, and Virginia
Frank Clair, who coached the Toronto Argonauts and Ottawa Rough Riders of the Canadian Football League to a total of five Grey Cup championships
Al Davis, late owner of the Los Angeles/Oakland Raiders
Chuck Noll, coached the Pittsburgh Steelers to four Super Bowl titles
Ara Parseghian, former coach at the University of Notre Dame who led the Fighting Irish to two national titles
Bo Schembechler, former coach at the University of Michigan 
Bill Walsh, who coached the San Francisco 49ers to three Super Bowl titles
Chuck Knox, former head coach of Los Angeles Rams, Buffalo Bills and Seattle Seahawks
Dick Vermeil, coached the St. Louis Rams to a Super Bowl title and the Philadelphia Eagles to the Super Bowl
George Allen, former coach of the Los Angeles Rams and Washington Redskins
Bum Phillips who coached for Gillman for 5 years in San Diego prior to coaching for him in Houston.

Coaching tree

Numbers in parenthesis indicate Super Bowls won by Gillman's "descendants" as head coach, a total of 28.

Don Coryell, the coach at San Diego State University when Gillman was coaching the San Diego Chargers, would bring his team to Chargers' practices to watch how Gillman ran his practices.  Coryell went on to coach in the NFL, and some of his assistants, influenced by the Gillman style, included coaches Joe Gibbs, Ernie Zampese, Tom Bass, and Russ A. Molzahn. A larger and more extended version of Sid Gillman's coaching tree, which in some ways could be called a forest, can be found here.

Honors and awards
Gillman was inducted into the Pro Football Hall of Fame in 1983, and into the College Football Hall of Fame in 1989. In 1990 he was inducted into the Southern California Jewish Sports Hall of Fame.

Personal life and Death
Gillman and his wife Esther had four children and were married for 67 years (until his death). They resided in Carlsbad, California before moving in 2001 to Century City in Los Angeles.

On January 3, 2003, Gillman died in his sleep at age 91. He was interred in the Hillside Memorial Park Cemetery in Culver City, California.

Head coaching record

College

AFL/NFL

See also
 List of American Football League players
 List of National Football League head coaches with 50 wins

References

External links
 
 
 Cradle of Coaches Archive: A Legacy of Excellence - Sid Gillman, Miami University Libraries
 Sid Gillman Collection, Cradle of Coaches Archive, Miami University Libraries

1911 births
2003 deaths
American football ends
Army Black Knights football coaches
Chicago Bears coaches
Cleveland Rams (AFL) players
Denison Big Red football coaches
Houston Oilers executives
Houston Oilers head coaches
Los Angeles Chargers executives
Los Angeles Chargers head coaches
Los Angeles Rams head coaches
Miami RedHawks football coaches
Michigan State Spartans football coaches
Ohio State Buckeyes football coaches
Ohio State Buckeyes football players
Philadelphia Eagles coaches
National Football League general managers
National Football League offensive coordinators
San Diego Chargers executives
San Diego Chargers head coaches
United States International Gulls athletic directors
American Football League All-Time Team
College Football Hall of Fame inductees
Pro Football Hall of Fame inductees
North Community High School alumni
Coaches of American football from Minnesota
Players of American football from Minneapolis
Jewish American sportspeople
Burials at Hillside Memorial Park Cemetery
20th-century American Jews
21st-century American Jews
Sports coaches from Minneapolis